Augustus Thomas (January 8, 1857 – August 12, 1934) was an American playwright.

Biography
Born in St. Louis, Missouri and son of a doctor, Thomas worked a number of jobs including as a page in the 41st Congress, studying law, and gaining some practical railway work experience before he turned to journalism and became editor of the Kansas City Mirror in 1889. Thomas had been writing since his teens when he wrote plays and even organized a small theatrical touring company.

Thomas was hired to work as an assistant at Pope's Theatre in St. Louis. During this time, he wrote a one-act play called Editha's Burglar, based on a short story by Frances Hodgson Burnett called The Burglar. After touring in the play, he expanded the show to four acts, renamed it The Burglar, and was able to get Maurice Barrymore to play the title role. Subsequently, he was hired to succeed Dion Boucicault adapting foreign plays for the Madison Square Theatre.

His first successful play, Alabama, was produced by Kirke La Shelle in 1891 and its financial reward allowed Thomas to write full-time. Alabama is the story of an un-reconstructed Confederate. Notably, Thomas was one of the first playwrights to make use of American material. Other plays along the same lines include Arizona (1900), In Mizzoura (1893), Colorado (1900) and Rio Grande (1916). Perhaps his most successful play was The Copperhead (1918) which made Lionel Barrymore a star.
d to The Lambs theatrical club in 1889 and served as its president from 1907 to 1910.

He died in 1934 and was buried in Bellefontaine Cemetery in St. Louis.

Select works

 Editha’s Burglar, 1884
 The Burglar, 1889 
 A Man of the World, 1889
 Reckless Temple, 1890
 A Woman of the World, 1890
 Alabama, 1891
 Colonel Carter of Cartersville, 1892
 In Mizzoura, 1893
 New Blood, 1894
 Arizona, 1900
 Oliver Goldsmith, 1900
 Colorado, 1900
 Soldiers of Fortune, 1902 (from 1897 Richard Harding Davis novel)
 The Earl of Pawtucket, 1903
 The Other Girl, 1903
 Mrs. Leffingwell’s Boots, 1905
 The Witching Hour, 1907
 The Harvest Moon, 1909
 The Member from Ozark, 1910
 As a Man Thinks, 1911
 The Copperhead, 1918
 Nemesis, 1921
 The Print of My Remembrance (autobiography), 1922
 Still Waters, 1926

Select filmography

 Arizona (1913)
 The Jungle (1914)
 Shore Acres (1914)
 Paid in Full (1914)
 The Nightingale (1914)
 Arizona (1918)
 The Capitol (1919) 
 The Bonnie Brier Bush (1921)
 Thirty Days (1922)
 The Family Secret (1924)
 Arizona (1931)

References

Hartnoll, Phyllis, ed. The Oxford Companion to the Theatre. 4th edition. London:Oxford UP, 1983. pps. 827–828.
Moody, Richard. "Augustus Thomas". in Banham, Martin, ed. The Cambridge Guide to Theatre, London:Cambridge UP, 1992.

External links

Bio.
 
 

1857 births
1934 deaths
American dramatists and playwrights
American newspaper editors
Writers from St. Louis
Writers from New Rochelle, New York
Members of the American Academy of Arts and Letters
American male screenwriters
Film producers from Missouri
Film directors from Missouri
Burials at Bellefontaine Cemetery
American male dramatists and playwrights
Journalists from New York (state)
Film directors from New York (state)
American male non-fiction writers
Screenwriters from New York (state)
Screenwriters from Missouri
Film producers from New York (state)
The Lambs presidents
20th-century American male writers
20th-century American screenwriters